The 1998 United States Senate election in Alabama was held November 3, 1998, alongside other elections to the United States Senate in other states as well as elections to the United States House of Representatives and various state and local elections. Incumbent Republican U.S. Senator Richard Shelby won re-election to a third term. Shelby was elected in 1986 and 1992 as a Democrat, but switched to the Republican party in 1994 after the Republican Revolution, making this the first election he competed in as a Republican.

Candidates

Republican 
 Richard Shelby, incumbent U.S. Senator since 1987

Democratic 
 Clayton Suddith, army veteran and former Franklin County Commissioner

Results

See also 
 1998 United States Senate elections

References 

United States Senate
Alabama
1998